The 1957–58 Boston Bruins season saw the Bruins finish in fourth place in the National Hockey League (NHL) with a record of 27 wins, 28 losses, and 15 ties for 69 points. They defeated the New York Rangers in six games in the Semi-finals before losing the Stanley Cup Finals, also in six games, to the Montreal Canadiens.

Offseason

NHL Draft

Regular season

Willie O'Ree
Midway through his second minor-league season with the Quebec Aces, O'Ree was called up to the Boston Bruins of the NHL to replace an injured player. O'Ree made his NHL debut with the Bruins on January 18, 1958, against the Montreal Canadiens, becoming the first black player in league history. He played in only two games that year.

Record vs. opponents

Season standings

Playoffs

Boston defeated the New York Rangers (4–2) in the semi-final to advance to the Cup Final against the Montreal Canadiens. The Canadiens, in the middle of their five-year Cup champion run, defeated the Bruins four games to two.

Player statistics

Regular season
Scoring

Goaltending

Playoffs
Scoring

Goaltending

Awards and honors

Milestones

References
 Bruins on Hockey Database

Boston Bruins seasons
Boston Bruins
Boston Bruins
Boston Bruins
Boston Bruins
1950s in Boston